A list of films produced in Brazil in 1932:

See also
 1932 in Brazil

External links
Brazilian films of 1932 at the Internet Movie Database

Brazil
1932
Films